The 1986–87 Biathlon World Cup was a multi-race tournament over a season of biathlon, organised by the UIPMB (Union Internationale de Pentathlon Moderne et Biathlon). The season started on 18 December 1986 in Obertauern, Austria, and ended on 15 March 1987 in Lillehammer, Norway. It was the tenth season of the Biathlon World Cup. The first round of the World Cup was originally going to be held in Hochfilzen, Austria, but the races were moved to Obertauern due to a lack of snow.

Calendar
Below is the World Cup calendar for the 1986–87 season.

 1987 World Championship races were not included in the 1986–87 World Cup scoring system.
 The relays were technically unofficial races as they did not count towards anything in the World Cup.

World Cup Podium

Men

Standings: Men

Overall 

Final standings after 12 races.

Achievements
First World Cup career victory
, 25, in his 5th season — the WC 1 Sprint in Obertauern; it also was his first podium
, 25, in his 5th season — the WC 2 Individual in Borovets; first podium was 1985–86 Individual in Lahti
, 21, in his 2nd season — the WC 3 Sprint in Antholz-Anterselva; first podium was 1986–87 Individual in Obertauern

First World Cup podium
, 28, — no. 2 in the WC 1 Individual in Obertauern
, 21, in his 2nd season — no. 3 in the WC 1 Individual in Obertauern
, 24, in his 5th season — no. 3 in the WC 1 Sprint in Obertauern
, 24, in his 4th season — no. 3 in the WC 4 Individual in Ruhpolding

Victory in this World Cup (all-time number of victories in parentheses)
, 2 (4) first places
, 2 (3) first places
, 1 (10) first place
, 1 (7) first place
, 1 (5) first place
, 1 (3) first place
, 1 (2) first place
, 1 (1) first place
, 1 (1) first place
, 1 (1) first place

Retirements
Following notable biathletes retired after the 1986–87 season:

Notes
1.  The Wintersport source places Finland 3rd, but after the fifth round of the World Cup, they were at ninth. And so it seems more logical that the Soviet Union placed 3rd as they were at second place before the last World Cup at Lillehammer in which the Soviets did not participate.

References

Biathlon World Cup
World Cup
World Cup